Adrian Kempe (born 13 September 1996) is a Swedish professional ice hockey player for the Los Angeles Kings of the National Hockey League (NHL). Kempe was selected by the Kings in the first round (29th overall) of the 2014 NHL Entry Draft.

Playing career

MODO Hockey
Kempe made his Swedish Hockey League debut playing with Modo Hockey during the 2013–14 season. At the end of the season, Kempe was selected in the first round (29th overall) by the Los Angeles Kings in the 2014 NHL Entry Draft. He returned to Modo for the 2014–15 season.

Los Angeles Kings
On 15 April 2015, the Kings signed Adrian Kempe to a three-year, entry-level contract. He was then immediately assigned to their American Hockey League (AHL) affiliate, the Manchester Monarchs for the postseason. The Monarchs defeated the Utica Comets in five games to win the Calder Cup. In 17 games, Kempe recorded nine points.

Kempe spent the entirety of the 2015–16 season in the American League with the Kings' new affiliate, the Ontario Reign. He recorded 28 points in 55 games.

Kempe began the 2016–17 season with the Reign, but was recalled by the Kings on 15 February 2017. He made his NHL debut the following day against the Arizona Coyotes. He recorded his first NHL point on 21 February by assisting on Tyler Toffoli's goal against the Colorado Avalanche and scored his first goal on 11 March against the Washington Capitals.

Prior to Kempe's first full season with the Kings, he switched from No. 39 to No. 9. He recorded his first NHL hat-trick in a 5–1 win over the Montreal Canadiens on 19 October.

On 4 September 2019, the Kings re-signed Kempe to a three-year, $6 million contract extension.

Entering his sixth season with the Kings, 2021–22 would be a breakout year for Kempe, who posted new career highs scoring 35 goals and 54 points. He would also participate in his first NHL All-Star Game, held in Las Vegas; he is the only player from the Kings named to the All Stars this season.

On July 8, 2022, Kempe signed a four-year, $22 million extension with the Kings.

Personal life
Kempe was born in Kramfors, Sweden, where he also grew up. His older brother, Mario, is also a professional ice hockey player in the Kings organization, and has also played for the Arizona Coyotes.

Career statistics

Regular season and playoffs

International

Awards and honours

References

External links
 

1996 births
Living people
Los Angeles Kings draft picks
Los Angeles Kings players
Manchester Monarchs (AHL) players
Modo Hockey players
National Hockey League first-round draft picks
Ontario Reign (AHL) players
People from Örnsköldsvik Municipality
Swedish ice hockey forwards
Sportspeople from Västernorrland County
21st-century Swedish people